Now Spring 2006 is a compilation CD released by Festival Mushroom Records, Warner Bros. Records & EMI Music Australia in 2006. It is the 14th CD in the Australian Now! series.

Track listing
Gnarls Barkley – "Crazy" (3:00)
Lily Allen – "Smile" (3:15)
The Veronicas – "Revolution" (3:04)
Evermore – "Running" (4:22)
Paris Hilton – "Stars Are Blind" (3:58)
Panic! at the Disco – "I Write Sins Not Tragedies" (3:06)
Zac Efron, Vanessa Hudgens and Drew Seeley – "Breaking Free" (3:26)
James Blunt – "High" (3:44)
T-Funk featuring Katie Underwood – "Be Together" (3:18)
Stacie Orrico – "I'm Not Missing You" (3:41)
End of Fashion – "The Game" (2:43)
The Kooks – "Naïve" (3:23)
Kate Alexa – "Somebody Out There" (3:09)
Beatfreakz – "Somebody's Watching Me" (Hi_Tack Edit) (2:47)
Danielle – "Underneath the Radar" (3:29)
The Living End – "Long Live the Weekend" (2:58)
T.I. – "Why You Wanna" (3:35)
Hard-Fi – "Hard to Beat" (4:13)
Dirty South featuring Boogie Fresh – "Spank" (3:30)
Nizlopi – "JCB" (3:48)
Youth Group – "Catching & Killing" (3:01)
Kasey Chambers – "Nothing at All" (3:22)

External links
 NOW Spring 2006 @ Australia Charts

2006 compilation albums
Now That's What I Call Music! albums (Australian series)
EMI Records compilation albums
Warner Records compilation albums